Martin Annen (born 12 February 1974 in Zug, Switzerland) is a bobsledder who competed from 1996 to 2006. Competing in two Winter Olympics, Annen won a total of three bronze medals (Two-man: 2002, 2006; Four-man: 2006).

Annen also won two bronze medals in the two-man event at the FIBT World Championships, earning them in 2001 and 2005.

In Bobsleigh World Cup, he has two combined men's championships (2001-2, 2004–5), three two-man championships (2000-1, 2001–2, 2004–5), and one four-man championship (2001–2).

References
Bobsleigh two-man Olympic medalists 1932–56 and since 1964
Bobsleigh four-man Olympic medalists for 1924, 1932–56, and since 1964
 Bobsleigh two-man world championship medalists since 1931
 FIBT profile
 List of combined men's bobsleigh World Cup champions: 1985–2007
List of four-man bobsleigh World Cup champions since 1985
List of two-man bobsleigh World Cup champions since 1985

1974 births
Living people
Swiss male bobsledders
Bobsledders at the 2002 Winter Olympics
Bobsledders at the 2006 Winter Olympics
Olympic bronze medalists for Switzerland
Olympic bobsledders of Switzerland
Olympic medalists in bobsleigh
Medalists at the 2006 Winter Olympics
Medalists at the 2002 Winter Olympics
People from Zug
Sportspeople from the canton of Zug
21st-century Swiss people